Hastula hastata is a species of sea snail in the family Terebridae, the auger snails. It is known by the common name shiny auger.

Distribution
This snail is native to the coast of the western Atlantic Ocean, where it occurs from Florida to Brazil.; also off Martinique and Barbados.

References

 Deshayes, G. P., 1859. A general review of the genus Terebra, and a description of new species. Proceedings of the Zoological Society of London 27: 270-321
 Bratcher, T., 1977. - Deshayes' terebrid types in Ecole des Mines, Paris. The Nautilus 91(2): 39-42
 Bratcher, T. & Cernohorsky, W. O., 1987 - Living Terebras of the world, a monograph of the recent Terebridae of the world, p. 240 pp
 Terryn Y. (2007). Terebridae: A Collectors Guide. Conchbooks & Natural Art. 59 pp + plates

External links
 Gmelin J.F. (1791). Vermes. In: Gmelin J.F. (Ed.) Caroli a Linnaei Systema Naturae per Regna Tria Naturae, Ed. 13. Tome 1(6). G.E. Beer, Lipsiae [Leipzig. pp. 3021-3910.]
 Deshayes G.P. (1859). A general review of the genus Terebra, and a description of new species. Proceedings of the Zoological Society of London. 27: 270-321
  Rosenberg, G.; Moretzsohn, F.; García, E. F. (2009). Gastropoda (Mollusca) of the Gulf of Mexico, Pp. 579–699 in: Felder, D.L. and D.K. Camp (eds.), Gulf of Mexico–Origins, Waters, and Biota. Texas A&M Press, College Station, Texas
  Fedosov, A. E.; Malcolm, G.; Terryn, Y.; Gorson, J.; Modica, M. V.; Holford, M.; Puillandre, N. (2020). Phylogenetic classification of the family Terebridae (Neogastropoda: Conoidea). Journal of Molluscan Studies. 85(4): 359-388
 MNHN, Paris: lectotype

Terebridae
Gastropods described in 1791